Alexander Mikhailovich Zverev (born 22 January 1960) is a former professional tennis player from Russia who competed for the Soviet Union.

Career
In 1979, he made his first appearance for the Soviet Davis Cup team.

Zverev was a bronze medalist in the men's singles event at the 1983 Summer Universiade and won a singles gold medal at the Friendship Games, which were held in 1984. He did better than two years earlier at the 1985 Summer Universiade, winning both the singles gold medal and the doubles gold medal, partnering Sergi Leonyuk, with whom he was also a gold medalist in the 1986 Goodwill Games.

He appeared in three Grand Slam tournaments during his career. In the 1985 Australian Open he qualified for the main draw and was beaten in the opening round by Tim Wilkison. Again playing as a qualifier, Zverev met Tim Mayotte in the first round of the 1986 Wimbledon Championships and was defeated in straight sets. As a mixed doubles player he took part in the 1986 French Open with Svetlana Cherneva.

Zverev played mostly on the Challenger circuit, where he had victories over two top 50 players, Andrei Chesnokov and Jan Gunnarsson. He did however make the second round of the 1985 Geneva Open, a Grand Prix tournament.

He played his final Davis Cup tie in 1987 and retired having taken part in 36 rubbers, from which he won 18. One of those was a doubles win over the Czechoslovak pairing of Libor Pimek and Tomáš Šmíd, the latter ranked number one in the world for doubles at the time.
Three time Soviet champion in men's singles and 4 time winner in men's doubles.

Personal life
In 1991, Zverev and his wife, professional tennis player Irina Zvereva, relocated to Germany. They are parents to tennis players Alexander and Mischa who both represent Germany on the ATP Tour.

Notes

References

1960 births
Living people
Soviet male tennis players
Universiade medalists in tennis
Soviet emigrants to Germany
Russian emigrants to Germany
Naturalized citizens of Germany
Sportspeople from Sochi
Goodwill Games medalists in tennis
Universiade gold medalists for the Soviet Union
Universiade bronze medalists for the Soviet Union
Medalists at the 1983 Summer Universiade
Medalists at the 1985 Summer Universiade
Competitors at the 1986 Goodwill Games
Friendship Games medalists in tennis